In Slavic mythology, bolotnik (from boloto, "swamp"), balotnik, bolotyanik or błotnik (Polish; [ˈbwɔtnik]; "mud" or "puddle") is a male swamp spirit. There are many descriptions of bolotnik. Usually he was portrayed  as a man or an old man who has big, frog-like eyes, a green beard and long hair. His body is covered with dirt, algae and fish scales. The legends from the Vitebsk Governorate of Russia said that bolotnik is a dirty, fat, eyeless creature that motionlessly sits at the bottom of the swamp. In some accounts bolotnik is also said to have long arms and a tail. Just like the majority of Slavic water spirits, he would lure and drag people into the water if they get close to the edge. It is believed that bolotnik has neither wife nor children; in the other legends he is married to bolotnitsa, a female swamp spirit. 

Bolotniki (plural) are rarely found in folklore, and the swamp-dwelling spirit was often thought of as a kind of vodyanoy, leshy or chort. The image of a bolotnitsa was mixed with those of a rusalka, a vodyaniha, a leshachikha, a «wild hag» and a swamp kikimora.

Name 
Bolotnik has a lot of names: bolotny (lit. «[he] from the swamp» or «swampy»), bolotny dedko («swamp old man», «swamp grandpa»), shut bolotny («swamp jester»), bolotny chort («swamp devil»), bolotny leshy («leshy of the swamp»), tsar bolotny («the Swamp Tsar» or «the Swamp King»), boloto («swamp»), antsybal, antsybul, antsybalka, antsybalit, anchibal, anchibol, balotnik, bolotyanik, ocheretyanik, błotnik (Old Polish). The naming "antsybal", according to one version, is an old borrowing from the Baltic languages, compared with the Lithuanian ančiabalis, meaning "duck swamp". According to another version, this is a borrowing of the Czech ančibél, which could be the result of combination of the words antikrist ("antichrist"), and d'abel ("devil").

Origin
North Slavs treated the swamps as dangerous and "unclean" places where chorty, biesy and other demons live.  The very origin of the swamps in the Vitebsk Governorate was associated with the earth, which, during the creation of land by God, the chort hid in his mouth, and then spat it out. 

The origin of bolotniki, according to popular legends, is the same as that of the rest of the evil spirits: they are fallen angels thrown down from heaven by God or the creations of Satan. It is unknown how swamp spirits were perceived in the pre-Christian era, but the Novgorod Kormchaia Book of the 13th century mentions that the Eastern pagan Slavs made sacrifices to the swamps.

Behavior 
It was believed that bolotnik or bolotnitsa would lure people or an animal to the swamp, before they drown them. An especially easy prey for the spirit is a person who plays the shepherd's pipe at night.

To lure people to the swamp, bolotnik quacked like a duck, mooed like a cow, gurgled like a blackcock or screamed. He also grew stupefying herbs near the swamp (such as ledum) and created lights on the surface of the water. When a person is already in the quagmire, bolotnik grabs them by the feet and slowly, but inevitably, drags them to the depths.

In the Cherepovets District of the Novgorod Governorate, it was believed that the swamp devils curse the house-building logs when they are transported through the swamp, and when a house is built from them, misfortunes begin to occur in it.

The Ukrainians of the Voronezh Governorate and the modern Belarusians of the Gomel Oblast say that the bolotnik invites passers-by, takes them to beautiful rooms in which music plays, treats them, dances with them, gives them gifts, however, when they come to their senses, it turns out that  they all this time sat in a swamp, and instead of gifts they have some kind of garbage.

In the Vitebsk Governorate, several types of swamp devils were distinguished. Orzhavinik (or arzhavenik;) was said to inhabit swamps rich in iron ore. He looks like a creature with dirty ginger fur, a thick belly and thin legs. Bagnik (also spelled bugnik;), a spirit of a lower rank, lives in bogs and never appears on the surface, and only grabs people by the legs. He can be noticed by the bubbles rising from the depths and by the "pale lights" sometimes visible in the swamp. On the surface, in the thickets of the willow, live spirits called lozoviki (or lazaviki). They are small, vine-colored creatures that entangle travelers in the bushes and then help them get out.  Beliefs also mention virovnik (from vir, a deep place in a swamp or river).

Unlike other demons, bolotnik is not afraid of thunderbolts, as they lose their power when they come into contact with the surface of the swamp. Bolotniki perish when the swamps are drained and in winter when they freeze over.

Polish błotnik is an evil spirit appearing in the form of a pitch-black man with a lantern in his hands, who, illuminating the way for the travelers, leads them astray towards the swamp. He is often associated with Boruta, the most well-known Polish devil from the town Łęczyca.

Bolotnitsa 
In the Russian North it is believed, that bolotnitsa is the mistress of the swamp and tundra. She is also known as the bolotnaya baba (lit. «the swamp witch», «the swamp hag» or «the swamp woman»), lopatnitsa and omutnitsa.

As with the bolotnik, there are many different descriptions of her. In some accounts she is a rusalka (or rusalka's sister). It was believed, for example, that a girl, who had died in a swamp or was carried away by an unclean spirit, could turn into the bolotnitsa. In some places she was considered to be more like a spirit that had no connections with the human race; according to one Russian folktale, Bolotnitsa is a singular being, one of the seven likhomanka sisters. In the Nizhny Novgorod Governorate, the bolotnitsa was portrayed as a beautiful young girl with pale-white, translucent skin, brown (or black) hair, green (or blue) eyes and goose (or frog) legs instead of normal legs. To hide them, bolotnitsa would sit on a giant water lily, putting her legs under her. She would lure people into the swamp with a weep for a help, pretending that she is drowning or asking them to show the way from a dark place. If they were charmed by her beauty, people would get close to her. She would then pounce on them and slowly pull them to the bottom of the swamp, or tickle them to death. It was sometimes believed that bolotnitsa loves to sing.

In other beliefs, such as in the Vologda Governorate, the bolotnitsa was described as an old hag with a large head. Modern residents of the Nizhny Novgorod Oblast believe that the bolotnitsa is shaggy, scary and green and that she sits in a swamp all the time, leaving it only at night.

In the north of the Omsk Governorate, there was a legend about a bolotnitsa named Marya, who lured young men to the swamp bumps, where they met their deaths. Marya was a girl from the Mansi tribe. She settled in the taiga due to unhappy relationships with men and became a shamaness. This legend is featured in the work of a Russian writer Vladimir Erakhtin, and it was told to him by his grandfather.

Bolotnitsy (plural) were attributed to a special malice: they were capable of causing storms, downpours and hail, thereby destroying crops. At night they would steal canvases and food from women.

Other related figures
Belarusian folklore features a boogeyman-like entity named Zhalezny chalavek ("Iron man"), who also lives in a swamp and is sometimes associated with bolotnik. He is a gigantic creature whose body is made of iron, and he is incredibly dangerous towards children. The belief is associated with a large amount of iron ore deposits in impenetrable forest bogs on the territory of Belarus, especially Polesie.

The swamp kikimora is a mischievous spirit, a close friend or a wife of a leshy. Beliefs about her are most widespread in Russia and less so in Belarus. She may look like a short, ugly old hag or a middle-aged woman covered in grasses and moss, but she usually takes on an invisible form. She scares travelers with loud screams, knocks them off the road, and sometimes even drowns them.

Babay (Баба́й), a night spirit from Russian and Ukrainian folklore, according to some beliefs, lives in a swamp, hiding in thickets of reeds during the daylight hours. Here also lives the North Russian lobasta (лоба́ста), an evil old hag of enormous growth with very large breasts. She grabs passersby and tickles them to death with her nipples.

Karakondjul from the Bulgarian and Serbian folklore may also inhabit swamp. This spirit is active at night and likes to play tricks on people by jumping on their backs and riding them until the morning.

Anchutka is an imp-like creature that may dwell in water, serving a bolotnik or vodyanoy. He is described as a small, nasty, horned and heelless creature. It is believed that he causes seizures in swimmers. Anchutka is the old Russian name for a bes. 

According to some accounts, the swamp spirits, including the bolotnik, bolotnitsa, kikimora and karakondjul, are the companions and assistants of Likho One-Eyed.

In Poland, the swamp was believed to be the home of boginki, dangerous female spirits that kidnapped babies. The latawiec, a spirit that takes the form of a fireball, was also believed to live in this place.

References

Sources

 

Slavic tutelary deities
 Slavic paganism 
 Water spirits